Below are the results of the FIS Alpine World Ski Championships 2007 men's super combined race which took place on 8 February 2007.

Results

References 

Men's Super Combined